Michael Peters is a Canadian neuropsychologist and University professor emeritus of psychology at the University of Guelph. He is known for researching functional asymmetries in the brain, especially hand preference. Additional research is on brain size in humans and spatial ability. Cited publications are listed in Google Scholar citations. He has also studied the link between individuals' sexual orientation and their spatial processing abilities.

References

External links
Faculty page

Canadian psychologists
Neuropsychologists
Living people
Academic staff of the University of Guelph
University of Calgary alumni
University of Western Ontario alumni
Year of birth missing (living people)